O Train could refer to:
The O-Train, a light-rail transit (LRT) service in Ottawa, Ontario, Canada
The O scale for model railroads
Oscar Robertson